The 2014 Texas Rangers season was the Rangers' 54th season of the franchise and the 43rd since the team relocated to Arlington, Texas. The Rangers suffered from injuries throughout the season and spent a substantial part of the season in last place in the American League (AL), at one point having a streak of 8–34. Manager Ron Washington resigned on September 5, 2014, citing personal issues. Despite finishing the season with a 13–3 stretch, The Rangers were unable to escape the AL cellar, but did manage to finish 67–95 and third worst in Major League Baseball (MLB), ahead of the Colorado Rockies and Arizona Diamondbacks of the National League (NL).

The Rangers used 40 different pitchers during the season, thus setting a new MLB record. The team played seven extra inning games, the fewest of any MLB team in 2014.

Season standings

American League West

American League Wild Card

Record vs. opponents

Game log

|- style="text-align:center; style="background-color:#ffbbbb;"
| 1 || March 31 || Phillies || 10–14 || C. Lee (1–0) || P. Figueroa (0–1) ||  || 49,031 || 0–1
|-

|- style="text-align:center; style="background-color:#bbffbb;"
| 2 || April 1 || Phillies || 3–2 || J. Soria (1–0) || M. Hollands (0–1) ||  || 29,530 || 1–1
|- style="text-align:center; style="background-color:#bbffbb;"
| 3 || April 2 || Phillies || 4–3 || S. Rosin (1–0) || J. Papelbon (0–1) ||  || 28,282 || 2–1
|- style="text-align:center; style="background-color:#ffbbbb;"
| 4 || April 4 || @ Rays || 1-8 || J. Odorizzi 1-0  || J. Saunders 0-1 ||  || 14,304 || 2–2
|- style="text-align:center; style="background-color:#ffbbbb;"
| 5 || April 5 || @ Rays || 4-5 || B. Gomes 1-0 || N. Cotts 0-1 || G. Balfour 1 || 30,364 || 2–3
|- style="text-align:center; style="background-color:#bbffbb;"
| 6 || April 6 || @ Rays || 3-0 || Y. Darvish 1-0 || J. Peralta 0-1 || J. Soria 1 || 22,569 || 3–3
|- style="text-align:center; style="background-color:#ffbbbb;"
| 7 || April 7 || @ Red Sox || 1-5 || J. Lackey 2-0 || T. Scheppers 0-1 ||  || 35,842 || 3–4
|- style="text-align:center; style="background-color:#bbffbb;"
| 8 || April 8 || @ Red Sox || 10-7 || M. Pérez 1-0 || F. Doubront 1-1 ||  || 34,142 || 4–4
|- style="text-align:center; style="background-color:#ffbbbb;"
| 9 || April 9 || @ Red Sox || 2-4 || A. Miller 1–0 || A. Ogando 0–1 || K. Uehara 2 ||  33,585 || 4–5
|- style="text-align:center; style="background-color:#bbffbb;"
| 10 || April 11 || Astros || 1-0 (12) || J. Frasor 1-0 || B. Peacock 0-1 ||  || 36,150 || 5–5
|- style="text-align:center; style="background-color:#ffbbbb;"
| 11 || April 12 || Astros || 5-6 (10) || K. Chapman 1-0 || J. Soria 1-1 || A. Bass 2 || 42,577 || 5–6
|- style="text-align:center; style="background-color:#bbffbb;"
| 12 || April 13 || Astros || 1-0 || M. Pérez 2-0 || B. Oberholtzer 0-3 || A. Ogando 1 || 38,698 || 6–6
|- style="text-align:center; style="background-color:#ffbbbb;"
| 13 || April 14 || Mariners || 1-7 || R. Elías 1-1 || C. Lewis 0-1 ||  || 23,081 || 6–7
|- style="text-align:center; style="background-color:#bbffbb;"
| 14 || April 15 || Mariners || 5-0 || R. Ross 1-0 || B. Beavan 0-1 ||  || 26,628 || 7–7
|- style="text-align:center; style="background-color:#bbffbb;"
| 15 || April 16 || Mariners || 3-2 || P. Figueroa 1-1 || F. Rodney 0-1 ||  || 27,396 || 8–7
|- style="text-align:center; style="background-color:#bbffbb;"
| 16 || April 17 || Mariners || 8-6 || P. Figueroa 2-1 || J. Beimel 0-1 || J. Soria 2 || 29,024 || 9–7
|- style="text-align:center; style="background-color:#bbffbb;"
| 17 || April 18 || White Sox || 12-0 || M. Pérez 3-0 || F. Paulino 0-2 ||  || 40,671 || 10–7
|- style="text-align:center; style="background-color:#bbffbb;"
| 18 || April 19 || White Sox || 6-3 || C. Lewis 1-1 || J. Quintana 1-1 || J. Soria 3 || 44,811 || 11–7
|- style="text-align:center; style="background-color:#ffbbbb;"
| 19 || April 20 || White Sox || 2-16 || E. Johnson 1-1 || R. Ross 1-1 ||  || 35,402 || 11–8
|- style="text-align:center; style="background-color:#bbffbb;"
| 20 || April 21 || @ Athletics || 4-3 || N. Cotts 1-1 || S. Doolittle 0-1 || J. Soria 4 || 13,297 || 12–8
|- style="text-align:center; style="background-color:#bbffbb;"
| 21 || April 22 || @ Athletics || 5-4 || A. Ogando 1-1 || L. Gregerson 0-1 || J. Soria 5 || 15,744 || 13–8
|- style="text-align:center; style="background-color:#bbffbb;"
| 22 || April 23 || @ Athletics || 3-0 || M. Pérez 4-0 || S. Gray 3-1 ||  || 18,340 || 14–8
|- style="text-align:center; style="background-color:#ffbbbb;"
| 23 || April 25 || @ Mariners || 5-6 || Y. Medina 1-1 || N. Cotts 1-2 || F. Rodney 4 || 31,149 || 14–9
|- style="text-align:center; style="background-color:#bbffbb;"
| 24 || April 26 || @ Mariners || 6-3 || A. Poreda 1-0 || C. Furbush 0-2 || J. Soria 6 || 30,038 || 15–9
|- style="text-align:center; style="background-color:#ffbbbb;"
| 25 || April 27 || @ Mariners || 5-6 || D. Farquhar 1-0 || A. Ogando 1-2 || F. Rodney 5 || 26,300 || 15–10
|- style="text-align:center; style="background-color:#ffbbbb;"
| 26 || April 28 || Athletics || 0-4 || S. Gray 4-1 || Y. Darvish 1-1 ||  || 28,548 || 15–11
|- style="text-align:center; style="background-color:#ffbbbb;"
| 27 || April 29 || Athletics || 3-9 || S. Kazmir 4-0 || M. Pérez 4-1 ||  || 30,221 || 15–12
|- style="text-align:center; style="background-color:#ffbbbb;"
| 28 || April 30 || Athletics || 1-12 || J. Chavez 2-0 || R. Ross 1-2 ||  || 32,979 || 15–13
|-

|- style="text-align:center; style="background-color:#bbffbb;"
| 29 || May 2 || @ Angels || 5-2 || C. Lewis 2-1 || H. Santiago 0-5 || J. Soria 7 || 42,989 || 16–13
|- style="text-align:center; style="background-color:#ffbbbb;"
| 30 || May 3 || @ Angels || 3-5 || G. Richards 3-0 || S. Tolleson 0-1 || J. Smith 3 || 39,107 || 16–14
|- style="text-align:center; style="background-color:#bbffbb;"
| 31 || May 4 || @ Angels || 14-3 || Y. Darvish 2-1 || T. Skaggs 2-1 ||  || 37,765 || 17–14
|- style="text-align:center; style="background-color:#ffbbbb;"
| 32 || May 5 || @ Rockies || 2-8 || J. Lyles 4-0 || M. Pérez 4-2 ||  || 26,242 || 17–15
|- style="text-align:center; style="background-color:#ffbbbb;"
| 33 || May 6 || @ Rockies || 1-12 || J. Nicasio 4-1 || R. Ross 1-3 ||  || 27,838 || 17–16
|- style="text-align:center; style="background-color:#ffbbbb;"
| 34 || May 7 || Rockies || 2-9 || J. de la Rosa 4-3 || C. Lewis 2-2 ||  || 29,467 || 17–17
|- style="text-align:center; style="background-color:#bbffbb;"
| 35 || May 8 || Rockies || 5-0 || M. Harrison 1-0 || F. Morales 3-2 ||  || 27,617 || 18–17
|- style="text-align:center; style="background-color:#bbffbb;"
| 36 || May 9 || Red Sox || 8-0 || Y. Darvish 3-1 || C. Buchholz 2-3 ||  || 45,392 || 19–17
|- style="text-align:center; style="background-color:#ffbbbb;"
| 37 || May 10 || Red Sox || 3-8 || J. Lester 4-4 || M. Pérez 4-3 ||  || 47,964 || 19–18
|- style="text-align:center; style="background-color:#ffbbbb;"
| 38 || May 11 || Red Sox || 2-5 || J. Lackey 5-2 || R. Ross 1-3 || K. Uehara 9 || 41,407 || 19–19
|- style="text-align:center; style="background-color:#bbffbb;"
| 39 || May 12 || @ Astros || 4-0 || C. Lewis 3-2 || B. Peacock 0-4 ||  || 14,617 || 20–19
|- style="text-align:center; style="background-color:#ffbbbb;"
| 40 || May 13 || @ Astros || 0-8 || D. Keuchel 0-2 || M. Harrison 1-1 ||  || 14,028 || 20–20
|- style="text-align:center; style="background-color:#ffbbbb;"
| 41 || May 14 || @ Astros || 4-5 || C. Qualls 1-1 || N. Martínez 0-1 ||  || 17,783 || 20–21
|- style="text-align:center; style="background-color:#ffbbbb;"
| 42 || May 16 || Blue Jays || 0-2 || D. Hutchison 2-3 || Y. Darvish 3-2 ||  || 39,129 || 20–22
|- style="text-align:center; style="background-color:#ffbbbb;"
| 43 || May 17 || Blue Jays || 2-4 || S. Delabar 3-0 || N. Cotts 1-3 || C. Janssen 3 || 39,723 || 20–23
|- style="text-align:center; style="background-color:#bbffbb;"
| 44 || May 18 || Blue Jays || 6-2 || A. Poreda 2-0 || R. A. Dickey 4-4 ||  || 43,671 || 21–23
|- style="text-align:center; style="background-color:#ffbbbb;"
| 45 || May 20 || Mariners || 2-6 || H. Iwakuma 3-0 || C. Lewis 3-3 ||  || 43,706 || 21–24
|- style="text-align:center; style="background-color:#bbffbb;"
| 46 || May 21 || Mariners || 4-3 || N. Tepsech 1-0 || C. Young 3-2 || J. Soria 8 || 43,654 || 22–24
|- style="text-align:center; style="background-color:#bbffbb;"
| 47 || May 22 || @ Tigers || 9-2 || Y. Darvish 4-2 || R. Ray 1-1 ||  || 40,768 || 23–24
|- style="text-align:center; style="background-color:#ffbbbb;"
| 48 || May 23 || @ Tigers || 2-7 || A. Sánchez 2-2 || S. Baker 0-1 ||  || 39,835 || 23–25
|- style="text-align:center; style="background-color:#bbffbb;"
| 49 || May 24 || @ Tigers || 12-2 || N. Martínez 1-1 || R. Porcello 7-2 ||  || 43,447 || 24–25
|- style="text-align:center; style="background-color:#bbffbb;"
| 50 || May 25 || @ Tigers || 12-4 || C. Lewis 4-3 || J. Verlander 5-4 ||  || 42,583 || 25–25
|- style="text-align:center; style="background-color:#bbffbb;"
| 51 || May 26 || @ Twins || 7-2 || N. Tepesch 2-0 || K. Correia 2-6 ||  || 30,571 || 26–25
|- style="text-align:center; style="background-color:#ffbbbb;"
| 52 || May 27 || @ Twins || 3-4 || G. Perkins 2-0 || J. Soria 1-2 ||  || 22,702 || 26–26
|- style="text-align:center; style="background-color:#bbffbb;"
| 53 || May 28 || @ Twins || 1-0 || S. Tolleson 1-1 || J. Burton 1-2 || J. Soria 9 || 26,472  || 27–26
|- style="text-align:center; style="background-color:#bbffbb;"
| 54 || May 29 || @ Twins || 5-4 || A. Ogando 2-2 || C. Fien 3-2 || J. Soria 10 || 28,170 || 28–26
|- style="text-align:center; style="background-color:#ffbbbb;"
| 55 || May 30 || @ Nationals || 2-9 || S. Strasburg 4-4 || C. Lewis 4-4 ||  || 31,659 || 28–27
|- style="text-align:center; style="background-color:#ffbbbb;"
| 56 || May 31 || @ Nationals || 2-10 || D. Fister 3-1 || N. Tepesch 2-1 ||  || 35,164 || 28–28
|-

|- style="text-align:center; style="background-color:#bbffbb;"
| 57 || June 1 || @ Nationals || 2-0 || Y. Darvish 5-2 || T. Roark 3-4 || J. Soria 11 || 32,813 || 29-28
|- style="text-align:center; style="background-color:#ffbbbb;"
| 58 || June 3 || Orioles || 3-8 || B. Matusz 2-1 || A. Ogando 2-3 ||  || 31,542 || 29-29
|- style="text-align:center; style="background-color:#ffbbbb;"
| 59 || June 4 || Orioles || 5-6 || B. Norris 4-5 || N. Martinez 1-2 || Z. Britton 5 || 27,934 || 29-30
|- style="text-align:center; style="background-color:#bbffbb;"
| 60 || June 5 || Orioles || 8-6 || R. Ross 2-4 || B. Matusz 2-2 || J. Soria 12 || 34,254 || 30-30
|- style="text-align:center; style="background-color:#bbffbb;"
| 61 || June 6 || Indians || 6-4 || Y. Darvish 6-2 || M. Rzepczynski 0-2 || J. Soria 13 || 38,348 || 31-30
|- style="text-align:center; style="background-color:#ffbbbb;"
| 62 || June 7 || Indians || 3-8 || J. Tomlin 4-2 || N. Tepesch 2-2 ||  || 34,633 || 31-31
|- style="text-align:center; style="background-color:#ffbbbb;"
| 63 || June 8 || Indians || 2-3 || J. Masterson 4-4 || J. Saunders 0-2 || C. Allen 6 || 34,613 || 31-32
|- style="text-align:center; style="background-color:#ffbbbb;"
| 64 || June 9 || Indians || 7-17 || S. Atchison 3-0 || N. Martinez 1-3 ||  || 29,362 || 31-33
|- style="text-align:center; style="background-color:#ffbbbb;"
| 65 || June 10 || Marlins || 5-8 || B. Morris 5-0 || J. Frasor 1-1 || S. Cishek 15 || 28,845 || 31-34
|- style="text-align:center; style="background-color:#bbffbb;"
| 66 || June 11 || Marlins || 6-0 || Y. Darvish 7-2 || J. Turner 2-4 ||  || 31,512 || 32-34
|- style="text-align:center; style="background-color:#bbffbb;"
| 67 || June 13 || @ Mariners || 1-0 || S. Tolleson 1-2 || F. Hernández 8-2 || J. Soria 14 || 22,039 || 33-34
|- style="text-align:center; style="background-color:#bbffbb;"
| 68 || June 14 || @ Mariners || 4-3 || N. Cotts 2-3 || F. Rodney 1-3 || J. Soria 15 || 27,700 || 34-34
|- style="text-align:center; style="background-color:#ffbbbb;"
| 69 || June 15 || @ Mariners || 1-5 || H. Iwakuma 5-3 || N. Martinez 1-4 ||  || 39,196 || 34-35
|- style="text-align:center; style="background-color:#bbffbb;"
| 70 || June 16 || @ Athletics || 14-8 || C. Lewis 5-4 || D. Pomeranz 5-4 ||  || 12,412 || 35-35
|- style="text-align:center; style="background-color:#ffbbbb;"
| 71 || June 17 || @ Athletics || 6-10 || T. Milone 5-3 || Y. Darvish 7-3 ||  || 21,288 || 35-36
|- style="text-align:center; style="background-color:#ffbbbb;"
| 72 || June 18 || @ Athletics || 2-4 || S. Gray 7-3 || N. Tepesch 2-3 || S. Doolittle 9 || 23,175 || 35-37
|- style="text-align:center; style="background-color:#ffbbbb;"
| 73 || June 20 || @ Angels || 3-7 || G. Richards 7-2 || J. Saunders 0-3 ||  || 41,637 || 35-38
|- style="text-align:center; style="background-color:#ffbbbb;"
| 74 || June 21 || @ Angels || 2-3 (10) || M. Morin 1-1 || N. Cotts 2-4 ||  || 37,026 || 35-39
|- style="text-align:center; style="background-color:#ffbbbb;"
| 75 || June 22 || @ Angels || 5-2 || M. Shoemaker 5-1 || Y. Darvish 7-4 ||  || 37,191 || 35-40
|- style="text-align:center; style="background-color:#ffbbbb;"
| 76 || June 24 || Tigers || 8-2 || D. Smyly 4-6 || C. Lewis 5-5 ||  || 35,526 || 35-41
|- style="text-align:center; style="background-color:#ffbbbb;"
| 77 || June 25 || Tigers || 6-8 || A. Sánchez 5-2 || J. Saunders 0-4 || J. Nathan 16 || 34,254 || 35-42
|- style="text-align:center; style="background-color:#ffbbbb;"
| 78 || June 26 || Tigers || 0-6 || R. Porcello 10-4 || N. Martinez 1-5 ||  || 34,989 || 35-43
|- style="text-align:center; style="background-color:#bbffbb;"
| 79 || June 27 || Twins || 5-4 || N. Tepesch 3-3 || K. Correia 4-9 ||  || 38,111 || 36-43 
|- style="text-align:center; style="background-color:#bbffbb;"
| 80 || June 28 || Twins || 5-0 || Y. Darvish 8-4 || P. Hughes 8-4 ||  || 30,620 || 37-43
|- style="text-align:center; style="background-color:#ffbbbb;"
| 81 || June 29 || Twins || 2-3 || K. Gibson 7-6 || J. Soria 1-3 || G. Perkins 20 || 36,779 || 37-44
|- style="text-align:center; style="background-color:#ffbbbb;"
| 82 || June 30 || @ Orioles || 1-7 || U. Jiménez 3-8 || J. Saunders 0-5 ||  || 15,252 || 37-45
|-

|- style="text-align:center; style="background-color:#ffbbbb;"
| 83 || July 1 || @ Orioles || 3-8 || T. J. McFarland (1-1) || N. Martinez (1-6) || – || 19,150 || 37-46
|- style="text-align:center; style="background-color:#ffbbbb;"
| 84 || July 2 || @ Orioles || 4-6 || B. Brach (2-0) || N. Cotts (2-5) || Z. Britton (11) || 13,478 || 37-47
|- style="text-align:center; style="background-color:#ffbbbb;"
| 85 || July 3 || @ Orioles || 2-5 || W. Chen (8-3) || S. Baker (0-2) || Z. Britton (12) || 24,535 || 37-48
|- style="text-align:center; style="background-color:#ffbbbb;"
| 86 || July 4 || @ Mets || 5-6 || J. Mejía (5-3) || A. Poreda (2-1) || – || 30,377 || 37-49
|- style="text-align:center; style="background-color:#bbffbb;"
| 87 || July 5 || @ Mets || 5-3 || C. Lewis (6-5) || B. Colón (8-7) || J. Soria (16) || 24,418 || 38-49
|- style="text-align:center; style="background-color:#ffbbbb;"
| 88 || July 6 || @ Mets || 4-8 || Z. Wheeler (4-8) || N. Tepesch (3-4) || – || 25,213 || 38-50
|- style="text-align:center; style="background-color:#ffbbbb;"
| 89 || July 7 || Astros || 7-12 || J. Cosart (9-6) || M. Mikolas (0-1) || – || 31,010 || 38-51
|- style="text-align:center; style="background-color:#ffbbbb;"
| 90 || July 8 || Astros || 3-8 || B. Peacock (3-5) || P. Irwin (0-1) || – || 32,608 || 38-52
|- style="text-align:center; style="background-color:#ffbbbb;"
| 91 || July 9 || Astros || 4-8 || D. Keuchel (9-5) || Y. Darvish (8-5) || – || 31,161 || 38-53
|- style="text-align:center; style="background-color:#ffbbbb;"
| 92 || July 10 || Angels || 6-15|| H. Santiago (1-7) || C. Lewis (6-6) || – || 30,686 || 38-54
|- style="text-align:center; style="background-color:#ffbbbb;"
| 93 || July 11 || Angels || 0-3 || G. Richards (11-2) || N. Tepesch (3-5) || J. Smith (13) || 38,402 || 38-55
|- style="text-align:center; style="background-color:#ffbbbb;"
| 94 || July 12 || Angels || 2-5 || J. Weaver (10-6) || M. Mikolas (0-2) || J. Smith (14) || 37,253 || 38-56
|- style="text-align:center; style="background-color:#ffbbbb;"
| 95 || July 13 || Angels || 7-10 || T. Skaggs (5-5) || S. Baker (0-3) || J. Smith (15) || 34,750 || 38-57
|- style="text-align:center; style="background-color:#bbffbb;"
| 96 || July 18 || @ Blue Jays || 5-1 || Y. Darvish (9-5) || R. A. Dickey (7-10) || – || 38,012 || 39-57
|- style="text-align:center; style="background-color:#ffbbbb;"
| 97 || July 19 || @ Blue Jays || 1-4 || M. Stroman (5-2)  || C. Lewis (6-7) || A. Loup (3) || 45,802 || 39-58
|- style="text-align:center; style="background-color:#ffbbbb;"
| 98 || July 20 || @ Blue Jays || 6-9 || T. Redmond (1-4)  || N. Feliz (0-1) || A. Loup (4) || 36,011 || 39-59
|- style="text-align:center; style="background-color:#bbffbb;"
| 99 || July 21 || @ Yankees || 4-2 || M. Mikolas (1-2) || S. Greene (2-1) || J. Soria (17) || 45,278 || 40-59
|- style="text-align:center; style="background-color:#ffbbbb;"
| 100 || July 22 || @ Yankees || 1-2(14) || J. Francis (1-2) || N. Tepesch (3-6) || – || 37,669 || 40-60
|- style="text-align:center; style="background-color:#ffbbbb;"
| 101 || July 23 || @ Yankees || 1-2(5) || D. Phelps (5-4) || y. Darvish (9-6) || – || 37,585 || 40-61
|- style="text-align:center; style="background-color:#ffbbbb;"
| 102 || July 24 || @ Yankees || 2-4 || B. McCarthy (5-10)  || C. Lewis (6-8) || D. Robertson (25) || 45,105 || 40-62
|- style="text-align:center; style="background-color:#bbffbb;"
| 103 || July 25 || Athletics ||4-1 || J. Williams (2-4) || J. Hammel (8-8) || N. Feliz (1) || 35,582 || 41-62
|- style="text-align:center; style="background-color:#ffbbbb;"
| 104 || July 26 || Athletics || 1-5 || S. Gray (12-3) || N. Tepesch (3-7) ||  || 34,651 || 41-63
|- style="text-align:center; style="background-color:#ffbbbb;"
| 105 || July 27 || Athletics || 3-9 || S. Kazmir (12-3) || M. Mikolas (1-3) ||  || 38,915 || 41-64
|- style="text-align:center; style="background-color:#bbffbb;"
| 106 || July 28 || Yankees || 4-2 || Y. Darvish (10-6) || D. Phelps (5-5) || N. Feliz (2) || 44,508 || 42-64
|- style="text-align:center; style="background-color:#ffbbbb;"
| 107 || July 29 || Yankees || 11-12 || B. McCarthy (6-10) || N. Martinez (1-7) || D. Robertson (27) || 41,934 || 42-65
|- style="text-align:center; style="background-color:#bbffbb;"
| 108 || July 30 || Yankees || 3-2 || C. Lewis (7-8) || H. Kuroda (7-7) || N. Feliz (3) || 46,599 || 43-65
|-

|- style="text-align:center; style="background-color:#ffbbbb;"
| 109 || August 1 || @ Indians || 2-12 || D. Salazar (4-4) || J. Williams (2-5) ||  || 27,009 || 43-66
|- style="text-align:center; style="background-color:#ffbbbb;"
| 110 || August 2 || @ Indians || 0-2 || S. Atchison (4-0) || M. Mikolas (1-4) || C. Allen (14)  || 28,285 || 43-67
|- style="text-align:center; style="background-color:#ffbbbb;"
| 111 || August 3 || @ Indians || 3-4 (12) || S. Atchison (5-0) || P. Klein (0-1) ||  || 18,422 || 43-68
|- style="text-align:center; style="background-color:#ffbbbb;"
| 112 || August 4 || @ White Sox || 3-5 (7) || H. Noesí (6-8) || N. Martinez (1-8) ||  || 17,040 || 43-69
|- style="text-align:center; style="background-color:#bbffbb;"
| 113 || August 5 || @ White Sox || 16-0 || C. Lewis (8-8) || J. Danks (9-7) || || 21,827 || 44-69
|- style="text-align:center; style="background-color:#bbffbb;"
| 114 || August 6 || @ White Sox || 3-1 || N. Tepesch (4-7) || C. Sale (10-2) || N. Feliz (4) || 18,898 || 45-69
|- style="text-align:center; style="background-color:#ffbbbb;"
| 115 || August 8 || @ Astros || 3-4 || J. Veras (2-0) || N. Cotts (2-6) || C. Qualls (14)  || 24,256 || 45-70
|- style="text-align:center; style="background-color:#ffbbbb;"
| 116 || August 9 || @ Astros || 3-8 || S. Feldman (6-8) || Y. Darvish (10-7) || || 24,019 || 45-71
|- style="text-align:center; style="background-color:#bbffbb;"
| 117 || August 10 || @ Astros || 6-2 || N. Martinez (2-8) || D. Keuchel (10-8) || || 19,239 || 46-71
|- style="text-align:center; style="background-color:#ffbbbb;"
| 118 || August 11 || Rays || 0-7 || D. Smyly (7-10) || C. Lewis (8-9) || || 28,501 || 46-72
|- style="text-align:center; style="background-color:#bbffbb;"
| 119 || August 12 || Rays || 3-2 (14) || S. Baker (1-3) || C. Ramos (2-5) || || 35,642 || 47-72
|- style="text-align:center; style="background-color:#ffbbbb;"
| 120 || August 13 || Rays || 1-10 || C. Archer (8-6) || M. Mikolas (1-5) || || 29,870 || 47-73
|- style="text-align:center; style="background-color:#ffbbbb;"
| 121 || August 14 || Rays || 3-6 || J. Odorizzi (9-9) || R. Ross (2-5) || J. McGee (13) || 28,940 || 47-74
|- style="text-align:center; style="background-color:#ffbbbb;"
| 122 || August 15 || Angels || 4-5 || G. Richards (13-4)  || N. Martinez (2-9) || H. Street (32) || 31,465 || 47-75
|- style="text-align:center; style="background-color:#ffbbbb;"
| 123 || August 16 || Angels || 4-5 || M. Shoemaker (11-4) || C. Lewis (8-10) || H. Street (33) || 32,209 || 47-76
|- style="text-align:center; style="background-color:#bbffbb;"
| 124 || August 17 || Angels || 3-2 || N. Feliz (1-1) || H. Street (1-1) ||  || 28,942 || 48-76
|- style="text-align:center; style="background-color:#ffbbbb;"
| 125 || August 19 || @ Marlins || 3-4 (10) || S. Dyson (2-0) || N. Cotts (2-7) ||  || 20,277 || 48-77
|- style="text-align:center; style="background-color:#bbffbb;"
| 126 || August 20 || @ Marlins || 5-4 || N. Martinez (3-9) || N. Eovaldi (6-8) || N. Feliz (5) || 16,674 || 49-77
|- style="text-align:center; style="background-color:#ffbbbb;"
| 127 || August 22 || Royals || 3-6 || Y. Ventura (10-9) || C. Lewis (8-11) || G. Holland (40) || 26,991 || 49-78
|- style="text-align:center; style="background-color:#ffbbbb;"
| 128 || August 23 || Royals || 3-6 || J. Guthrie (10-10) || N. Tepesch (4-8) ||  || 27,400 || 49-79
|- style="text-align:center; style="background-color:#bbffbb;"
| 129 || August 24 || Royals || 3-1 || S. Baker (2-3) || J. Vargas (10-6) || N. Feliz (6) || 30,049 || 50-79
|- style="text-align:center; style="background-color:#bbffbb;"
| 130 || August 25 || @ Mariners || 2-0 || M. Mikolas (2-5) || R. Elias (9-11) || N. Feliz (7) || 21,620 || 51-79
|- style="text-align:center; style="background-color:#ffbbbb;"
| 131 || August 26 || @ Mariners || 0-5 || J. Paxton (4-1) || N. Martinez (3-10) ||  || 20,469 || 51-80
|- style="text-align:center; style="background-color:#bbffbb;"
| 132 || August 27 || @ Mariners || 12-4 || C. Lewis (9-11) || E. Ramirez (1-6) ||  || 29,463 || 52-80
|- style="text-align:center; style="background-color:#ffbbbb;"
| 133 || August 28 || @ Astros || 2-4 || C. McHugh (7-9) || R. Mendez (0-1) || T. Sipp (2) || 16,399 || 52-81
|- style="text-align:center; style="background-color:#bbffbb;"
| 134 || August 29 || @ Astros || 13-6 || S. Baker (3-3) || B. Oberholtzer (4-10) ||  || 18,931 || 53-81
|- style="text-align:center; style="background-color:#ffbbbb;"
| 135 || August 30 || @ Astros || 0-2 || S. Feldman (8-10) || P. Klein ||  || 24,771 || 53-82
|- style="text-align:center; style="background-color:#ffbbbb;"
| 136 || August 31 || @ Astros || 2-3 || J. Veras (3-1) || N. Cotts (2-8) || C. Qualls (16) || 19,024 || 53-83
|-

|- style="text-align:center; style="background-color:#ffbbbb;"
| 137 || September 1 || @ Royals || 3-4 || Y. Ventura (11-9) || C. Lewis (9-12) || G. Holland (41) || 21,536 || 53-84
|- style="text-align:center; style="background-color:#ffbbbb;"
| 138 || September 2 || @ Royals || 1-2 || J. Frasor (4-1) || M. Kirkman (0-1) || A. Crow (3) || 19,435 || 53-85
|- style="text-align:center; style="background-color:#ffbbbb;"
| 139 || September 3 || @ Royals || 1-4 || J. Vargas (11-7) || N. Tepesch (4-9) || G. Holland (42) || 15,771 || 53-86
|- style="text-align:center; style="background-color:#ffbbbb;"
| 140 || September 4 || Mariners || 2-10 || R. Elias (10-12) || R. Ross (2-6) ||  || 26,965 || 53-87
|- style="text-align:center; style="background-color:#ffbbbb;"
| 141 || September 5 || Mariners || 5-7 || H. Iwakuma (14-6) || S. Baker (3-4) || F. Rodney (42) || 23,428 || 53-88
|- style="text-align:center; style="background-color:#ffbbbb;"
| 142 || September 6 || Mariners || 2-4 || D. Farquhar (2-1) || N. Cotts (2-9) || F. Rodney (43) || 29,552 || 53-89
|- style="text-align:center; style="background-color:#bbffbb;"
| 143 || September 7 || Mariners || 1-0 || D. Holland (1-0) || J. Paxton (5-2) || N. Feliz (8) || 26,851 || 54-89
|- style="text-align:center; style="background-color:#ffbbbb;"
| 144 || September 9 || Angels || 3-9 || H. Santiago (5-7) || C. Lewis (9-13) ||  || 26,054 || 54-90
|- style="text-align:center; style="background-color:#ffbbbb;"
| 145 || September 10 || Angels || 1-8  || M. Shoemaker (15-4) || N. Tepesch (4-10) ||  || 26,611  || 54-91
|- style="text-align:center; style="background-color:#ffbbbb;"
| 146 || September 11 || Angels || 3-7 || M. Morin (4-3) || N. Martinez (3-11) ||  || 27,129  || 54-92
|- style="text-align:center; style="background-color:#bbffbb;"
| 147 || September 12 || Braves || 2-1 || P. Klein (1-2) || D. Carpenter (6-4) || N. Feliz (9) || 19,835  || 55-92
|- style="text-align:center; style="background-color:#bbffbb;"
| 148 || September 13 || Braves || 3-2 || L. Bonilla (1-0) || J. Teheran (13-12) || N. Cotts (1) || 17,530  || 56-92
|- style="text-align:center; style="background-color:#bbffbb;"
| 149 || September 14 || Braves || 10-3 || C. Lewis (10-13) || M. Minor (6-11) ||  || 17,574 || 57-92
|- style="text-align:center; style="background-color:#bbffbb;"
| 150 || September 16 || @ Athletics || 6-3 || N. Tepesch (5-10) || S. Kazmir (14-9) || N. Feliz (10) || 19,835 || 58-92
|- style="text-align:center; style="background-color:#bbffbb;"
| 151 || September 17 || @ Athletics || 6-1 || R. Ross (3-6) || S. Doolittle (1-4) ||  || 17,530 || 59-92
|- style="text-align:center; style="background-color:#bbffbb;"
| 152 || September 18 || @ Athletics || 7-2 || N. Martinez (4-11) || S. Gray (13-9) ||  || 17,574 || 60-92
|- style="text-align:center; style="background-color:#bbffbb;"
| 153 || September 19 || @ Angels || 12-3 || L. Bonilla (2-0) || H. Santiago (5-9) ||  || 38,467 || 61-92
|- style="text-align:center; style="background-color:#ffbbbb;"
| 154 || September 20 || @ Angels || 5-8 || J. Weaver (18-8) || C. Lewis (10-14) || H. Street (39) || 35,890 || 61-93
|- style="text-align:center; style="background-color:#bbffbb;"
| 155 || September 21 || @ Angels || 2-1 || S. Tolleson (3-1) || H. Street (2-2) || N. Feliz (11) || 27,166 || 62-93
|- style="text-align:center; style="background-color:#bbffbb;"
| 156 || September 22 || Astros || 4-3 || D. Holland (2-0) || N. Tropeano (1-2) || N. Feliz (12) || 28,717 || 63-93
|- style="text-align:center; style="background-color:#bbffbb;"
| 157 || September 23 || Astros || 2-1 || N. Martinez (5-11) || B. Oberholtzer (5-13) || N. Cotts (2) || 29,794 || 64-93
|- style="text-align:center; style="background-color:#bbffbb;"
| 158 || September 24 || Astros || 5-1 || L. Bonilla (3-0) || S. Feldman (8-12) ||  || 28,003 || 65-93
|- style="text-align:center; style="background-color:#bbffbb;"
| 159 || September 25 || Athletics || 2-1 || N. Feliz (2-1) || L. Gregerson (5-5) ||  || 33,696 || 66-93
|- style="text-align:center; style="background-color:#ffbbbb;"
| 160 || September 26 || Athletics || 2-6 || S. Kazmir (15-9) || N. Tepesch (5-11) ||  || 31,586 || 66-94
|- style="text-align:center; style="background-color:#bbffbb;"
| 161 || September 27 || Athletics || 5-4 || S. Patton (1-0) || J. Samardzija (7-13) || N. Feliz (13) || 35,326 || 67-94
|- style="text-align:center; style="background-color:#ffbbbb;"
| 162 || September 28 || Athletics || 0-4 || S. Gray (14-10) || N. Martinez (5-12) ||  || 36,381 || 67-95
|-

Roster

Farm system

References

External links

2014 Texas Rangers at Baseball Reference

Texas Rangers seasons
Texas Rangers
Rangers